Nigoh Khas is a village falls in Thesil Chhibramau under district Kannauj district in the northern state of Uttar Pradesh, India.  The village is lying along the National Highway No. 91 (G.T. Road) on Delhi (Dadri) – Kanpur route. The nearest airport is at Lucknow (151 km) and Gursahaiganj (25 km) Railway Station is the nearest railway station.

Demographics 
Hindi is the local language.

Transport 
 By Rail
The nearest railway stations are at Farrukhabad and Gursahiganj, respectively 31 km and 25 km distant.
 By Bus
Chhibramau is nearest Bus Depot and Bus station, which is 3 km from Nigoh Khas. Rickshaws and autos are available from Chhibrmau.

Education 
There is a primary school in the village. Thereafter, pupils have to travel to Chhibramau.

Distance of other major cities and towns 
 West
 Bewar (18.5 km)
 Mainpuri (48 km)
 Agra (162 km)
 Aligarh (166 km )
 Delhi (397 km )
North
 Mohammadabad, Farrukhabad (18.6 km)
 Farrukhabad (35.1 km )
 East
 Gursahaiganj (28 km )
 Kanpur (128 km)
 Allahabad (328 km)
 South
 Saurikh (11 km)
 Bidhuna (49 km)

Nearby villages
 Sarai Bhim
 Ladaita
 Rampur Nigoh
 Bahadur Pur Nigoh
 Jawamardpur
 Sikandar Pur Nigoh
 Panthra
 Sainsar Pur
 Kundepur
 Khanpur Kurmi
 Nandlal Pur

References

 http://164.100.129.4/netnrega/Progofficer/PoIndexFrame.aspx?flag_debited=R&lflag=local&District_Code=3168&district_name=KANNAUJ&state_name=%E0%A4%89%E0%A4%A4%E0%A5%8D%E0%A4%A4%E0%A4%B0%E0%A4%AA%E0%A5%8D%E0%A4%B0%E0%A4%A6%E0%A5%87%E0%A4%B6&state_Code=31&finyear=2015-2016&check=1&block_name=CHHIBRAMAU&Block_Code=3168005

Villages in Kannauj district